Humor Risk, also known as Humorisk, is a lost unreleased 1921 silent comedy short film that was the first film to star the Marx Brothers (Groucho Marx, Harpo Marx, Chico Marx and Zeppo Marx).

Production 
Humor Risk was directed by comedy film director Dick Smith (1886–1937), and was the first film written by Jo Swerling, who later co-wrote It's a Wonderful Life, Gone with the Wind and many other films. It was filmed in Fort Lee, New Jersey. The film's title was a spoof of the Fannie Hurst drama Humoresque, one of the biggest film hits of 1920.

The print may have been accidentally thrown away when left in the screening box overnight. Another version of the story says that Groucho Marx, unhappy with the film's quality, intentionally burned the negative after a particularly bad premiere screening.

Synopsis
Information about the plot of the film is sparse. It is known that the brothers were working separately, rather than as a team, and did not incorporate their trademark comic personalities for which they later became known.

Harpo played the hero, a detective named Watson who "made his entrance in a high hat, sliding down a coal chute into the basement". Groucho played an "old movie" villain, who "sported a long moustache and was clad in black", while Chico was probably his "chuckling [Italian] henchman". Zeppo portrayed a playboy who was the owner of a nightclub in which most of the action took place, including "a cabaret, [which allowed] the inclusion of a dance number". The final shot showed Groucho "in ball and chain, trudging slowly off into the gloaming". Harpo, in a rare moment of romantic glory, gets the girl in the end.

Cast
Four of the five Marx Brothers are known to have been in this short film. Jobyna Ralston is most often mentioned as the female lead. However, some sources say that Mildred Davis—star and later wife of Harold Lloyd—was also in the film. The websites Marxology and SilentEra both state that the leading lady could have been one of two other actresses, Esther Ralston or Helen Kane.

The Marx Brothers would later find success in motion pictures with The Cocoanuts (1929).

See also
List of United States comedy films
List of lost films

References

External links
 
 Humor Risk at Silent Era
 Discussion at NitrateVille
 Humor Risk at Marxology
 The Marx Brothers’ Lost Film: Getting to the Bottom of a Mystery at Brenton Film
 Caravel Comedies listing in Motion Picture Studio Directory and Trade Annual 1921

1921 films
1921 comedy films
Lost American films
Marx Brothers (film series)
American black-and-white films
1920s English-language films
Unreleased American films
American silent short films
Films shot in Fort Lee, New Jersey
Films with screenplays by Jo Swerling
Silent American comedy films
1921 lost films
Lost comedy films
1920s American films